Angular (also referred to as "Angular 2+") is a TypeScript-based, free and open-source web application framework led by the Angular Team at Google and by a community of individuals and corporations. Angular is a complete rewrite from the same team that built AngularJS. Angular is a Single Page Application Framework which is used for creating Fast Web Applications. It uses concepts of SPA in which UI is delivered in the beginning of application request and later only data is requested which makes SPA applications fast.

Differences between Angular and AngularJS

Google designed Angular as a ground-up rewrite of AngularJS.
 Angular does not have a concept of "scope" or controllers; instead, it uses a hierarchy of components as its primary architectural characteristic.
 Angular has a different expression syntax, focusing on "[ ]" for property binding, and "( )" for event binding
 Modularity – much core functionality has moved to modules
 Angular recommends the use of Microsoft's TypeScript language, which introduces the following features:
Static typing, including Generics
 Type annotations
 Dynamic loading
 Asynchronous template compilations
 Iterative callbacks provided by RxJS.
 Support to run Angular applications on servers.

History

Naming 
The rewrite of AngularJS was called "Angular 2", but this led to confusion among developers. To clarify, the Team announced that separate names should be used for each framework with "AngularJS" referring to the 1.X versions and "Angular" without the "JS" referring to versions 2 and up.

Version 2
Angular 2.0 was announced at the ng-Europe conference 22–23 October 2014. The drastic changes in the 2.0 version created considerable controversy among developers. On April 30, 2015, the Angular developers announced that Angular 2 moved from Alpha to Developer Preview. Angular 2 moved to Beta in December 2015, and the first release candidate was published in May 2016. The final version was released on 14 September 2016.

Version 4 
On 13 December 2016 Angular 4 was announced, skipping 3 to avoid a confusion due to the misalignment of the router package's version which was already distributed as v3.3.0. The final version was released on 23 March 2017. Angular 4 is backward compatible with Angular 2.

Angular version 4.3 is a minor release, meaning that it contains no breaking changes and that it is a drop-in replacement for 4.x.x.

Features in version 4.3
 Introducing HttpClient, a smaller, easier to use, and more powerful library for making HTTP Requests.
 New router life cycle events for Guards and Resolvers. Four new events: GuardsCheckStart, GuardsCheckEnd, ResolveStart, ResolveEnd join the existing set of life cycle event such as NavigationStart.
 Conditionally disable animations.

Version 5 
Angular 5 was released on 1 November 2017. Key improvements in Angular 5 include support for progressive web apps, a build optimizer and improvements related to Material Design.

Version 6
Angular 6 was released on 4 May 2018. This is a major release focused less on the underlying framework and more on the toolchain and on making it easier to move quickly with Angular in the future, like: ng update, ng add, Angular Elements, Angular Material + CDK Components, Angular Material Starter Components, CLI Workspaces, Library Support, Tree Shakable Providers, Animations Performance Improvements, and RxJS v6.

Version 7
Angular 7 was released on 18 October 2018. Updates regarding Application Performance, Angular Material & CDK, Virtual Scrolling, Improved Accessibility of Selects, now supports Content Projection using web standard for custom elements, and dependency updates regarding Typescript 3.1, RxJS 6.3, Node 10 (still supporting Node 8).

Version 8
Angular 8 was released on 28 May 2019. Featuring Differential loading for all application code, Dynamic imports for lazy routes, Web workers, TypeScript 3.4 support, and Angular Ivy as an opt-in preview. Angular Ivy opt-in preview includes:
 Generated code that is easier to read and debug at runtime
 Faster re-build time
 Improved payload size
 Improved template type checking
 Backwards compatibility

Version 9 
Angular 9 was released on 6 February 2020. Version 9 moves all applications to use the Ivy compiler and runtime by default. Angular has been updated to work with TypeScript 3.6 and 3.7. In addition to hundreds of bug fixes, the Ivy compiler and runtime offers numerous advantages:

 Smaller bundle sizes
 Faster testing
 Better debugging
 Improved CSS class and style binding
 Improved type checking
 Improved build errors
 Improved build times, enabling AOT on by default
 Improved Internationalisation

Version 10 
Angular 10 was released on 24 June 2020.

 New Date Range Picker (Material UI library)
 Warnings about CommonJS imports
 Optional Stricter Settings
 Keeping Up to Date with the Ecosystem
 New Default Browser Configuration
 Deprecations and Removals

Version 11 
Angular 11 was released on 11 November 2020.

Version 12 
Angular 12 was released on 12 May 2021.

 Deprecated support for IE11

Version 13 
Angular 13 was released on 4 November 2021

Version 14 
Angular 14 was released on 2 June 2022.  Some new features include typed forms, standalone components, and new primitives in the Angular CDK (component dev kit). Standalone components work across Angular, and they now fully work in HttpClient, Angular Elements, router and more.

Version 15 
Angular 15 was released on 16 November 2022. Standalone APIs graduated from developer preview and are now part of the stable API surface.

Future releases 
Since v9, the Angular team has moved all new applications to use the Ivy compiler and runtime. They will be working on Ivy to improve output bundle sizes and development speeds.

Each version is expected to be backward-compatible with the prior release. The Angular development team has pledged to do twice-a-year upgrades.

Support policy and schedule 
All the major releases are supported for 18 months. This consists of 6 months of active support, during which regularly-scheduled updates and patches are released. It is then followed by 12 months of long-term support (LTS), during which only critical fixes and security patches are released.

Angular versions v2 to v12 are no longer under support.

Libraries

Angular Material 

Angular Material is a UI component library that implements Material Design in Angular.

See also

React (JavaScript library)
Vue.js
Svelte
Comparison of JavaScript frameworks
JavaScript framework

References

External links
 Official website
 Archived website (Angular 2)

Google software
Software using the MIT license
Ajax (programming)
JavaScript libraries
2016 software
JavaScript web frameworks